Paisano Park is a census-designated place (CDP) in San Patricio County, Texas, United States. The population was 130 at the 2010 census. Prior to the 2010 census Paisano Park was part of the Edgewater-Paisano CDP.

Geography
Paisano Park is located at  (28.095075, -97.859207).

References

Census-designated places in San Patricio County, Texas
Census-designated places in Texas
Corpus Christi metropolitan area